Sekwaran  is a village in Kishtwar district of the Indian union territory of Jammu and Kashmir.

References

Villages in Kishtwar district